Sweden's entry to the Eurovision Song Contest 1995, held in Dublin, Ireland, was Jan Johansen with the song "Se på mig".

Before Eurovision

Melodifestivalen 1995 
Melodifestivalen 1995 was the selection for the 35th song to represent Sweden at the Eurovision Song Contest. It was the 34th time that this system of picking a song had been used. 986 songs were submitted to SVT for the competition. The final was held in the Malmö Musikteater in Malmö on 24 February 1995, presented by Pernilla Månsson Colt and broadcast on TV2 and Sveriges Radio's P3 and P4 networks. The show was watched by 3,646,000 people.

At Eurovision
On the night of the contest Johansen performed 18th, following Cyprus and following Denmark. One of the favourites to win, it finished in 3rd place with 100 points.

Voting

References

External links
TV broadcastings at SVT's open archive

1995
Countries in the Eurovision Song Contest 1995
1995
Eurovision
Eurovision